Atkinson is an English-language surname. The name is derived from a patronymic form of the Middle English Atkin. The personal name Atkin is one of many pet forms of the name Adam.

The name corresponds to the Scottish name Aitchison. The name Atkinson is particularly common in Northern England. At the time of the British Census of 1881, its relative frequency was highest in Westmorland (19.8 times the British average), followed by Cumberland, County Durham, Northumberland, Yorkshire, Lincolnshire, Lancashire, Cheshire and Rutland. In Ireland the name is common only in Ulster and particularly in counties Antrim and Down. Some Atkinsons are descended from Planters, although the name was recorded in Ireland before that period.

Acheson is a variation of the name in Scotland and the Border region, having been originally spelled Atzinson (with the 'z' being pronounced as 'y', as in yet).

People with the surname

A
 Adeline Detroit Wood Atkinson (1841–1916), American hotelier
 Aimie Atkinson, British stage actress and singer
 Al Atkinson, American football player
 Alan Atkinson, Australian Rules footballer
 Alfred Atkinson, British soldier
Alia Atkinson, Jamaican swimmer
 Anthony Barnes Atkinson, British economist
 Arthur Atkinson (disambiguation), multiple people
 Arthur K. Atkinson, American railroad president
 Ashlie Atkinson, American actress

B
 Barbara Atkinson (1926–2015), English actress
 Basil Atkinson, (1895–1971) Under-librarian of Cambridge University, writer on theology
 Bert Atkinson, fictional character from EastEnders
 Bill Atkinson, creator of Apple Computer's QuickDraw, MacPaint and HyperCard
 Bill Atkinson (baseball), Major League Baseball pitcher
 Bill Atkinson (designer) (1916-1995), American fashion designer
 Bill Atkinson (footballer, born 1944) (1944–2013), English footballer
 Brodie Atkinson, Australian rules footballer
 Brooks Atkinson, New York Times theatre critic
 Bruce Atkinson, Australian politician

C
 Cam Atkinson, American ice hockey player
 Carl Atkinson (d. 1985), Australian diver and salvage expert
 Chloe Atkinson, fictional character from the British soap opera Emmerdale
 Chris Atkinson, Australian rally driver
 C. T. Atkinson, (1874—1964), Oxford military historian
 Christopher Atkinson (missionary) (fl 1652–5), early Quaker missionary from Westmorland and one of the Valiant Sixty
 Christopher Atkinson Saville (–1819), alter known as Christopher Atkinson until about 1798, English merchant and politician
 Colin Atkinson, British cricketer and teacher

D
 Dalian Atkinson, British footballer
 Damon Atkinson, Drummer
 Dan Atkinson, British journalist and author
 Denis Atkinson, Barbadian cricketer
 Donald R. Atkinson, American psychologist
 Dorothy Atkinson (born 1966), English actress and singer
 Dorothy Atkinson (historian) (1929–2016), American historian

E
 Edith Atkinson
 Eleanor Stackhouse Atkinson, American writer
 Eric Atkinson, Barbadian cricketer, brother of Denis
 Eugene Atkinson, American politician

F
 Frank Atkinson (actor), British actor
 Fred Atkinson, American Director of Education in the Philippines (1900–1902)
 Frederick Atkinson (1919–2018), British civil servant
 Frederick Valentine Atkinson, British mathematician

G
 Gemma Atkinson, British actress and model
 George Atkinson (disambiguation), multiple people
 Graham Atkinson, British footballer

H
 Harry Atkinson, New Zealand premier
 Harry E. Atkinson, American politician
 Henry Atkinson (disambiguation), multiple people
 Hugh Atkinson (footballer) (born 1960), Irish footballer (Wolves, Exeter)

I
 Isabel Atkinson (1891–1968), British-Canadian philanthropist and women's rights activist

J
 James Atkinson (disambiguation), multiple people
 Janelle Atkinson (born 1982), Jamaican freestyle swimmer
 Janette Atkinson, British psychologist and academic
 Janice Atkinson British MEP for the South East England region
 Jerry Atkinson, American politician
 Joanne Atkinson, English swimmer and Olympic athlete
 John Atkinson (disambiguation), multiple people
 Jon Atkinson, English cricketer
 Joseph E. Atkinson, Canadian newspaper editor
 Josh Atkinson, English footballer
 Juliette Atkinson, American tennis player
 June Atkinson, American politician

K
 Kate Atkinson (actress) (born 1972), Australian actress
Kate Atkinson (writer), British writer
 Ken Atkinson, Canadian politician

L
 La'Tangela Atkinson, American basketball player
 Lawrence Atkinson, English artist, musician and poet
 Lefty Atkinson, American baseball player 
 Leigh Atkinson, English swimmer
 Leonard Atkinson, British engineer and senior British Army officer
 Leonard A. Atkinson, New Zealand civil servant
 Lily Atkinson, New Zealand temperance campaigner, suffragist and feminist
 Lisle Atkinson, American musician
 Llewellyn Atkinson, Australian politician
 Louis E. Atkinson, American physician, attorney and politician
 Louisa Atkinson, Australian writer, botanist and illustrator
 Lucas Atkinson, American politician
 Lucy Atkinson, English explorer and author

M
 Mark Atkinson (disambiguation), multiple people
 Martin Atkinson, English football referee
 Maudie Atkinson, fictional character from Harper Lee's novel To Kill A Mockingbird
 Michael Atkinson (politician), Australian politician
Michael Atkinson (Inspector General), American Inspector General of the Intelligence Community
 Mike Atkinson (born 1994), footballer

N
 Neville Atkinson, Royal Navy pilot
 Norman Atkinson (1923–2013), British politician

P
 Paul Atkinson (disambiguation), multiple people
 Peter Atkinson (disambiguation), multiple people

R
 Rebecca Atkinson (disambiguation), multiple people
 Richard Atkinson (disambiguation), multiple people
 Rick Atkinson, American writer and editor
 Robert d'Escourt Atkinson, physicist
 Robert Atkinson (disambiguation), multiple people
 Ron Atkinson ("Big Ron"), British football manager
 Ronald Field Atkinson (1928–2005), British philosopher
 Rowan Atkinson (born 1955), British comedian, known for his role as Mr. Bean
 Ruth Atkinson, American comics artist

S
 Sallyanne Atkinson, Australian politician
 Shane Atkinson, New Zealand spammer
 Sophie Atkinson, English-Canadian landscape painter
 Steve Atkinson, Canadian ice hockey player
 Steve Atkinson (cricketer) (born 1952), English cricketer
 Stan Atkinson, American news anchor

T
 Ted Atkinson, Canadian jockey
 Terry Atkinson, British artist
 Thomas Lewis Atkinson, English engraver
 Ti-Grace Atkinson, American feminist writer
 Tiffany Atkinson (born 1972), British poet
 Todd Atkinson, Canadian Anglican bishop
 Thomas Witlam Atkinson (1799–1861), English architect, artist and traveller 
 Tom Atkinson (1930–1990), English cricketer

V
 Val Atkinson (born 1894), Australian theatrical producer
 Vanessa Atkinson, Dutch squash player

W
 Whittier C. Atkinson, American physician
 William J. Atkinson, American scientist
 William Stephen Atkinson, Indian lepidopterist
 William Walker Atkinson (Yogi Ramacharaka), American writer
 William Yates Atkinson, 55th Governor of Georgia from 1894 to 1898

Species named after a person named Atkinson

 Lethrinus atkinsoni, a fish of the family Lethrinidae from the Pacific Ocean, described by Alvin Seale in 1910

See also 
Acheson (surname)
Atkinson (disambiguation)

References

English-language surnames
Surnames of English origin
Patronymic surnames